Horacio Raúl Martínez (born 24 April 1987) is an Argentine professional footballer who plays as a forward for San Telmo.

Career
Martínez left Estudiantes to play for Grupo Universitario, with the forward scoring eleven goals in twenty-eight Torneo Argentino B fixtures. In 2010, Martínez moved to Italian football with Latina. He scored seven goals in the 2010–11 Lega Pro Seconda Divisione as the club won promotion to Lega Pro Prima Divisione as Group C winners. Martínez subsequently left the club, joining Serie D side Arezzo. He remained for three seasons in the fourth tier, netting thirteen goals in his opening season before scoring eight and six in his remaining two; he also scored another six across cup and play-off football. Martínez departed Italy in 2014.

In 2015, Martínez joined Torneo Federal A's Mitre back in his homeland. After no appearances for the Santiago del Estero club, Martínez signed for Sportivo Las Parejas in January 2016. Having spent the 2016–17 campaign in Primera C Metropolitana with Cañuelas, where he netted twenty-three times in thirty-one fixtures, Douglas Haig became Martínez's seventh senior club on 22 August 2017. He scored two goals in his first two matches - versus Central Córdoba and Libertad respectively - on the way to eleven goals in 2017–18. In June 2018, Martínez joined Atlanta. He scored sixteen times after twenty-three games in tier three.

Career statistics
.

References

External links

1987 births
Living people
Footballers from Rosario, Santa Fe
Argentine footballers
Association football forwards
Argentine expatriate footballers
Expatriate footballers in Italy
Argentine expatriate sportspeople in Italy
Torneo Argentino B players
Serie C players
Serie D players
Torneo Federal A players
Primera C Metropolitana players
Primera B Metropolitana players
Grupo Universitario de Tandil players
Latina Calcio 1932 players
S.S. Arezzo players
Club Atlético Mitre footballers
Sportivo Las Parejas footballers
Cañuelas footballers
Club Atlético Douglas Haig players
Club Atlético Atlanta footballers
Nueva Chicago footballers
San Telmo footballers